The 1994 State Wildcats football team represented California State University, Chico as a member of the Northern California Athletic Conference (NCAC) during the 1994 NCAA Division II football season. Led by sixth-year head coach Gary Hauser, Chico State compiled an overall record of 3–6 with a mark of 2–1 in conference play, sharing the NCAC title with Humboldt State and Sonoma State. The team was outscored by its opponents 263 to 159 for the season. The Wildcats played home games at University Stadium in Chico, California.

Schedule

References

Chico State
Chico State Wildcats football seasons
Northern California Athletic Conference football champion seasons
Chico State Wildcats football